Heidi O'Rourke is a retired American synchronized swimming competitor, who won 10 national titles between 1969 and 1971. In 1971, she received the perfect score of 10 at the U.S. Indoor and Outdoor championships (becoming the only athlete to do so in a national AAU Championship) and at the 1971 Pan American Games, where she won three gold medals. After retiring in 1971, she toured Europe with demonstration events and coached the national teams of Switzerland, Spain, and Austria. She also portrayed Eleanor Holm in the 1975 musical film Funny Lady. 

In 1980, she was inducted into the International Swimming Hall of Fame.

See also
 List of members of the International Swimming Hall of Fame

References

Date of birth missing (living people)
Living people
American synchronized swimmers
Pan American Games gold medalists for the United States
Pan American Games medalists in synchronized swimming
Year of birth missing (living people)
Synchronized swimmers at the 1971 Pan American Games
Medalists at the 1971 Pan American Games